Farnham Town Football Club is a semi-professional football club based in Farnham, Surrey, England.

History
The club was established in 1906 as a merger of Farnham Bungs and Farnham Star. They became members of the Surrey Intermediate League, and were champions in 1929–30 and 1930–31. In 1947 they joined the Surrey Senior League. In 1962 they left the league, but they returned in 1963. They went on to win three successive league titles in 1965–66, 1966–67 and 1967–68 and were runners-up in 1969–70 and 1970–71, before joining the Spartan League in 1971. When the league merged with the Metropolitan–London League to form the London Spartan League in 1975, the club were placed in Division One, which became the Premier Division in 1977.

After finishing bottom of the London Spartan Premier Division in 1979–80, Farnham transferred to the Combined Counties League. The 1981–82 season saw them play in the Western Division as the league was temporarily split into two divisions, before reverting to a single division the following season. They were runners-up in 1986–87 and went on to win the league in 1990–91. The following season saw them retain the league title, as well as winning the Premier Challenge Cup and the Elite Cup. They were subsequently promoted to Division Three of the Isthmian League but resigned from the league prior to the start of the 1992–93 season as they were unable to raise the money needed to upgrade the Memorial Ground and were too late to rejoin the Combined Counties League until the following season.

Farnham won the Premier Challenge Cup for a second time in 1995–96. When the Combined Counties League gained a second division in 2003, they became members of the Premier Division. However, they were relegated to Division One after finishing bottom of the Premier Division in 2005–06. They won Division One at the first attempt, but were not promoted due to ground grading issues, and remained in the division until they finished as runners-up in 2010–11, after which they were promoted back to the Premier Division. The club won the Challenge Cup again in 2015–16. In 2017–18 they finished bottom of the Premier Division and were relegated to Division One. In 2021 the club were promoted to the Premier Division South based on their results in the abandoned 2019–20 and 2020–21 seasons.

Ground
The club plays at the Memorial Ground, which was originally home to Farnham United Breweries before being gifted to the town in 1947; it was named in memory of five Farnham United Breweries workers who were killed during World War I. The ground currently has a capacity of 1,500, of which 50 is seated.

Honours
Combined Counties League
Premier Division champions 1990–91, 1991–92
Division One champions 2006–07
Challenge Cup winners 1991–92, 1995–96, 2015–16
Elite Cup winners 1991–92
Surrey Senior League
Champions 1965–66, 1966–67, 1967–68
Surrey Intermediate League
Champions 1929–30, 1930–31
Surrey Junior Cup
Winners 1945–46

Records
Best FA Cup performance: Second qualifying round 1999–2000
Best FA Vase performance: Fourth round, 1976–77

References

External links
Official  website

Football clubs in England
Football clubs in Surrey
1906 establishments in England
Association football clubs established in 1906
Farnham
Surrey County Intermediate League (Western)
Surrey Senior League
Spartan League
Combined Counties Football League
Isthmian League